The 2009 FIBA Asia Under-16 Championship for Women is the qualifying tournament for FIBA Asia at the 2010 Under-17 World Championship for Women at Rodez and Toulouse, France. The tournament was held on Pune, India from 30 November to 6 December. China defeated Japan to notch their maiden title in the Championship.

Draw

Preliminary round

Group A

Group B

Classification 5th–12th

11th place

9th place

7th place

5th place

Final round

Semifinals

3rd place

Final

Final standing

Awards

References

External links
FIBA Asia

2009
2009 in women's basketball
2009–10 in Asian basketball
International women's basketball competitions hosted by India
Bask
Sports competitions in Pune
2009 in youth sport